Raccoon Mountain Pumped-Storage Plant is a pumped-storage hydroelectric underground power station in Marion County, just west of Chattanooga in the U.S. state of Tennessee.

The facility is owned and operated by the Tennessee Valley Authority (TVA). Construction was started in 1970 and was completed in 1978.

Water is pumped from Nickajack Lake on the Tennessee River at the base of Raccoon Mountain to a storage reservoir built at the top of the mountain. It takes 28 hours to fill the upper reservoir. During periods of high electric demand, water can be released from the reservoir through a tunnel drilled through the center of the mountain, driving electric generators in an underground hydroelectric plant. The plant is used most days and serves as an important element for peak power generation and grid balancing in the TVA system.

The plant was idled in March 2012 due to cracks in the generators' rotors. The plant came entirely back on line in April 2014.

Recreation
Raccoon Mountain is used for hiking, walking, running, road and mountain biking. It hosts a marathon, half marathon, double half marathon, relay, 5K and 10K race each year.

References

External links

Dams completed in 1978
Energy infrastructure completed in 1978
Pumped-storage hydroelectric power stations in the United States
Hydroelectric power plants in Tennessee
Reservoirs in Tennessee
Dams in Tennessee
Tennessee Valley Authority dams
Buildings and structures in Marion County, Tennessee
1978 establishments in Tennessee
Landforms of Marion County, Tennessee
Underground power stations